Miniya Chatterji (born 6 March 1979) is a prominent business woman, public intellectual, and the author of Indian Instincts (Penguin Random House, January 2018). She writes frequently in newspapers. She is the founder and CEO of Sustain Labs Paris . Sustain Labs is an enterprise based in India, UAE, and New Zealand that partners with organisations to make them more environmentally and socially responsible as well as profitable. The company also ranks India's most sustainable companies each year. It has founded India's first UG - PhD climate school Anant School for Climate Action, which also offers India's first undergraduate degree focusing on solutions for climate change . It led the establishment of 28 COVID hospitals across 5 states in India, by transforming existing vacant buildings. It was acclaimed for innovations such as building COVID ambulances and mobile COVID testing facilities within an auto rickshaw, and successfully taking it to market. Miniya is an established sustainability adviser and public speaker, advocating the cause of sustainable growth of Indian and global businesses. Miniya was featured in Business World's 40 under 40 achievers list 2019. She is also visiting professor at Sciences Po Paris since 2015. She has founded a Masters course on sustainability which she teaches at the Paris School of Management and Innovation and the Paris School of International Affairs at Sciences-po Paris. 

She was previously working as the Chief Sustainability Officer (CSO) at the Jindal Steel and Power Ltd. (JSPL) and was one of the youngest top business women in India at the time.

Miniya was an employee of the ‘World Economic Forum’ (WEF), and was also a Global Leadership Fellow from 2011 to 2014.

She has been a speaker or moderator at Davos and at other World Economic Forum regional summits, the United Nations, European Union, PE International, Microsoft Innovation Cup and Digital-Life-Design (DLD).

Miniya is a Jury Member for the Million Dollar Global Teacher Prize and for The Circulars award at Davos.

Early life and career
Dr. Miniya Chatterji was born in Jamshedpur, and completed her bachelor's degree and master's at Jawaharlal Nehru University (JNU), New Delhi in 2001. She completed her PhD & DEA Honors from Sciences Po, Paris in 2003, with research fellowships at Harvard University in 2004 and Columbia University in 2006–2007.

From 2004 to 2006 she worked closely with the office of the French President Jacques Chirac in Paris, as policy analyst to Jerome Monod who at that time was the President's Chief Advisor.

In 2007, she was a Private Wealth Management Summer Associate for Goldman Sachs London, post which she worked as Hedge Fund Manager at HSBC Hedge Funds in Paris.

She further completed her PhD in Political Sciences in 2009 from Institut d'Etudes Politiques de Paris.

While working with the World Economic Forum, in 2010 she founded the Stargazers Foundation, which aimed towards working in the domains of education and health for women in economically backward regions of India.

As part of her job at the World Economic Forum Chatterji has also completed an Executive Management Programme in Leadership from The Wharton School, Columbia University, as well as from INSEAD.

Jindal Steel and Power Ltd
In June 2014, Miniya returned to India after 14 years of living her entire adult life abroad, to join Jindal Steel & Power Group of Companies, as their Chief Sustainability Officer. She was responsible for setting up the JSPL's Business Sustainability division and led a global team across countries including India, South Africa, Oman and Australia. She created and implemented business strategies for the mid and long term holistic success of the US$3.14 billion steel, power, infrastructure global business conglomerate. She published various editions of JSPL's Business Sustainability report as per GRI (Global Reporting Initiative) G4 framework.

Sustain Labs Paris
Miniya parted ways with JSPL in September 2017, to establish her entrepreneurial brainchild "Sustain Labs Paris".

She founded Sustain Labs Paris, with offices in New Delhi and Paris in pedagogic partnership with the prestigious Paris School of International Affairs at Sciences-po Paris which is Europe's premier graduate school for policy studies, and is backed by the Institut français India.

Writer and columnist
Published by Penguin Random House, Indian Instincts (book), was launched in January 2018. The book is a set of 15 inter-linked essays on the quality of freedom and equality in India. It positions itself as a defining and influential work, one that would be able to explain the idea of India and ‘Indianness’ for several years to come, in its rightful and deserved context.

She is a columnist for The Indian Express, The Pioneer, and Harvard Business Review. She is represented by literary agent David Godwin in London.

Stargazers Foundation
Miniya founded the Stargazers Foundation, a Not-for-Profit organization in 2010.

It works in the domains of education and health for women in economically backward regions. The objective is to ultimately include healthy and skilled women from these backgrounds into the mainstream economy and governance structures.

Awards and recognition
She has won numerous awards. On an individual level, she has been awarded by the Navoothan Foundation, for her personal social commitment. She has also been awarded the prestigious CSR India award 2016 for corporate social responsibility. She was awarded as India's most influential leader in the field of sustainability at the India Sustainability Leadership Summit and Awards in 2018. In 2019 she was named in Business World's 40 under 40 Most Influential Business Leaders in India list.

Personal life
Miniya is married to businessman Chirag Lilaramani. They have one son. Miniya is passionate about textiles and hand-looms, which got her featured on the cover of Raw Mango's look book 2015, as well as Vogue.

References

External links
 
 
 
 
 
 </ref>
 
 http://www.business-standard.com/company/jindal-steel-20287/annual-report/director-report

1979 births
Living people
Women writers from Jharkhand
People from Jamshedpur